María Ellingsen (born 22 January 1964) is an Icelandic actress  starring in movies such as The Mighty Ducks 2. She can speak Icelandic, English, German, Danish and Faroese. She had a contract role on NBC's daytime drama Santa Barbara as Katrina Rukyer from 1991 to 1992.

Selected filmography
 Inter Nos (1982)
 D2: The Mighty Ducks (1994)
 Count Me Out (1997)
 Of Horses and Men (2013)

References

External links

1964 births
Living people
Maria Ellingsen
Maria Ellingsen
Maria Ellingsen
Maria Ellingsen